Break the Barrier was a professional wrestling supercard event held at Viking Hall, better known as the ECW Arena, in Philadelphia, Pennsylvania on May 15, 1999. The event was organized by the founders of Scoopswrestling.com, Al Isaacs, Remy Arteaga and Barbi Bistrowitz, and brought together some of the top independent wrestlers from around the country. It was one of the biggest interpromotional events in the United States and represented by 12 independent promotions including Allied Powers Wrestling Federation, Combat Zone Wrestling, Extreme Championship Wrestling, Independent Pro Wrestling, Independent Professional Wrestling Alliance, Maryland Championship Wrestling, Music City Wrestling, NWA New Jersey, New Dimension Wrestling, South's Greatest Wrestling Fans, Steel City Wrestling, World Legion Wrestling and World Wrestling Organization. Pro Wrestling Illustrated has called it "one of the greatest Supercards of all time".

Event 
Tom Brandi won the main event, an interpromotional battle royal, and presented a trophy from the promoter Al Isaacs. Instead of accepting the award, Brandi instead attacked Isaac and powerbombed him through a table. The undercard featured a "First blood" match between Fang (Allied Powers Wrestling Federation) and Blade Boudreaux (South's Greatest Wrestling Fans). Ten minutes into the match, Abdullah the Butcher came out and attacked both men. Abdullah cut up Fang with a fork and then rolled him into a coffin which he rolled backstage.

Four new champions were also crowned that night. Mike Quackenbush defeated Lou Marconi and Don Montoya to become the first SCW "Lord of the Dance" Champion, Nick Gage defeated Justice Pain in an impromptu staple gun match to become the first CZW Hardcore Champion, Scab defeated Natrone Steele in a Ladder Match to become the WWO Heavyweight Champion, and Stevie Richards defeated Jimmy Cicero and Tom Brandi in a Three Way Dance to win the APWF World Title. That night also saw the reunion of The Headbangers and Shane Douglas delivering a controversial "shoot" interview which ended with his quitting ECW one day before its Hardcore Heaven pay-per-view.

Show results

See also
1999 in professional wrestling

References

General

Specific

External links
Break the Barrier at Cagematch.de
Break the Barrier at GenickBruch.com

Combat Zone Wrestling shows
Extreme Championship Wrestling supercards and pay-per-view events
National Wrestling Alliance shows
1999 in professional wrestling
1999 in Pennsylvania
Events in Philadelphia
May 1999 events in the United States
Professional wrestling joint events